My Love Story is the seventh studio album of Toni Gonzaga under Star Records released on October 17, 2015, on Spotify, six days later on iTunes Philippines, and November 13 for CD format in the Philippines.

Gonzaga considered that this album contained the theme songs of her love story with her husband. As of August 2018, the album sold 7,000 units, 5,000 of which were pure sales.

Background
Gonzaga first announced the details of her seventh album through her instragram account in October. In same month, StarMusic Philippines officially announced the release date of the album and single through Instagram.

''It’s time for the ULTIMATE COMEBACK!,'' noted.

Toni was inspired to do the LP after her wedding in June with Director Paul Soriano. She recalls it and the courtship of Soriano years ago. There are seven songs which consist of six revivals and the rearranged and newly mastered version of her 2007 hit, Catch Me, I’m Falling.

In addition, she believes that the set of songs were perfectly suits the story of love that she does with her husband. The entire album is like a short story of their shared love to each other which transpired and themed through music.

 “Music moves you in different ways. And when you’re in love, it echoes the emotional chord of your heart,”  Gonzaga said.

Prior to its release, she simultaneously performed each song on ASAP.

Production
The music and arrangement was done by herself and long-time professional partner, Jonathan Manalo. The selection of songs was chosen by Gonzaga herself. She also decided to do Interlude for each song which she talks about the details of courtship of Soriano. The last track is Catch Me, I’m Falling. It is sung and recorded dramatically compared to the 2007 version, with complete accompaniment of strings and piano.

Promotion
In October 2015, Gonzaga already sung Baby Now That I've Found You in various events including Acer campaign and others. Months later in January 2016, Star Music Philippines announced the official date list of her tour in February which started at Eastwood Open Park and SM City Baliwag a day after. Then in Vizayas region in March. She took rest after her Vistamall Taguig in Taguig on the 26th of the month. 2 months later, she announced the 9th and last date which is on June 1, 2016, at SM City Trere Martires.
As part of the album promotion, Gonzaga shared her Love Story Documentary on MYX Philippines on June 9, 2016.

Singles
Baby, Now That I've Found You was the first single of the album. It was released on October 14, 2015, which premiered exclusively on MOR 101.9 radio station.

Track listing

Personnel
Executive Producers – Malou N. Santos & Roxy LLiquigan
A & R Audio Content Head / Over-all Album Producer – Jonathan Manalo
Star Songs, Inc. & New Media Head – Marivic Benedicto
Sales & Distribution – Regie Sandel
Star Event Officer – Darwin Chiang
Promo Specialist – Jason Sarmiento
Promo Associate – Jholina Luspo
Music Publishing Officer – Beth Faustino
New Media Technical Assistant – Eaizen Almazan
Licensing Officer – Selwin Scotts de Jesus
Music Servicing Officer – Abbey Aledo
Graphic Design & Layout – Christine Joy I. Cheng
Creative Head – Andrew Castillo
Photographer – Pat Dy
Hair Stylist – Macy Dionido
Make-up Artist – Krist Bansuelo
Stylists – Veronica Gonzales, Miyuki Nishida, & Raj Rivera
Album Mixed & Mastered by Dante Tañedo

Release history

References 

2015 albums
Toni Gonzaga albums